Geneviève Dulude-De Celles is a Canadian film director, who received a Canadian Screen Award nomination for Best Director at the 7th Canadian Screen Awards in 2019 for her debut feature film A Colony (Une colonie).

She previously directed the short film The Cut (La Coupe), which was a nominee for Best Live Action Short Drama at the 3rd Canadian Screen Awards in 2015, and the documentary film Welcome to F.L..

She was a cofounder of Colonelle Films with Sarah Mannering and Fanny Drew.

References

External links

21st-century Canadian screenwriters
21st-century Canadian women writers
Canadian women screenwriters
Canadian women film directors
Writers from Quebec
Film directors from Quebec
Living people
Year of birth missing (living people)
People from Sorel-Tracy
Best First Feature Genie and Canadian Screen Award winners
Canadian film production company founders